In mathematics, an asymmetric relation is a binary relation  on a set  where for all  if  is related to  then  is not related to

Formal definition 

This can be written in the notation of first-order logic as

A logically equivalent definition is:

which in first-order logic can be written as:

An example of an asymmetric relation is the "less than" relation  between real numbers: if  then necessarily  is not less than  The "less than or equal" relation  on the other hand, is not asymmetric, because reversing for example,  produces  and both are true.
Asymmetry is not the same thing as "not symmetric": the less-than-or-equal relation is an example of a relation that is neither symmetric nor asymmetric. The empty relation is the only relation that is (vacuously) both symmetric and asymmetric.

Properties 

 A relation is asymmetric if and only if it is both antisymmetric and irreflexive.
 Restrictions and converses of asymmetric relations are also asymmetric.
 A transitive relation is asymmetric if and only if it is irreflexive: if  and  transitivity gives  contradicting irreflexivity. 
 As a consequence, a relation is transitive and asymmetric if and only if it is a strict partial order.
 Not all asymmetric relations are strict partial orders. An example of an asymmetric non-transitive, even antitransitive relation is the  relation: if  beats  then  does not beat  and if  beats  and  beats  then  does not beat 
 An asymmetric relation need not have the connex property. A relation is connex if and only if its complement is asymmetric.

See also 

 Tarski's axiomatization of the reals – part of this is the requirement that  over the real numbers be asymmetric.

References

Binary relations
Asymmetry